Innoruvan is a 2009 Tamil-language comedy drama film directed by S. T. Gunasekaran. The film stars newcomers Adithya and Manoha, with Visu, Manivannan, M. S. Bhaskar, Dhandapani, R. Aravindraj, Pasi Sathya, Vincent Roy, P. R. Varalakshmi, and Crane Manohar playing supporting roles. It was released on 6 March 2009.

Plot
Siva (Adithya) is a naive ragpicker who works for Vaali (M. S. Bhaskar) and lives with his widow mother (Pasi Sathya). His life changes when he meets a judge (Visu) who motivates him and lectures him about Swami Vivekananda's principles and philosophies. Siva dreams to buy a closed paper mill, so he decides to work hard and with positive thinking to realize his dream. In the meantime, Siva falls in love with the college student Kavinaya (Manoha), daughter of the greedy politician Sadhasivam (Manivannan). Siva starts to woo her, and it annoys Kavinaya. Therefore, she and her father get Siva arrested, and the police brutally beat him up. Thereafter, Kavinaya understands Siva's feelings and eventually accepts his true love. Sadhasivam cheats the local minister and idol smuggler Aranganayagam (Dhandapani). He takes away his 1000 crores of rupees and escapes with the money. Aranganayagam's henchmen then try to abduct Kavinaya, but Siva comes to her rescue and saves her. Thereafter, Siva gets a bank loan thanks to the help of a well-wisher and rents a paper-mill. With the support of a corrupt cop (Vincent Roy), Aranganayagam once again abducts Kavinaya. To save his lover, Siva steals a Murugan idol in a famous temple and hides it in Aranganayagam's house. When the police search into Aranganayagam's house, they find several idols and arrests him; thus, Kavinaya is saved. The film ends with Siva buying the paper mill of his dream.

Cast

Adithya as Siva
Manoha as Kavinaya
Visu as Judge
Manivannan as Sadhasivam
M. S. Bhaskar as Vaali
Dhandapani as Aranganayagam
R. Aravindraj as Police Inspector
Pasi Sathya as Siva's mother
Vincent Roy as Assistant Commissioner
P. R. Varalakshmi as Aranganayagam's wife
Crane Manohar
Swaminathan
Easter as LIC Agent
Kalidoss as Swamy
Gowthami Vembunathan
Azhagu
Risha in a special appearance
Vahini in a special appearance

Production
S. T. Gunasekaran, a former associate of director R. Aravindraj, made his directorial debut with Innoruvan. The film was launched on 5 April 2008 at the AVM Studios in Chennai. Newcomers Adithya and Manoha were signed to play the lead roles. Veteran actors like Visu, Manivannan, Dhandapani, M. S. Bhaskar and Crane Manohar were hired to play prominent roles. G. Kanagaraj took care of camera works while Aadhish Uthriyan scored the music and the editing was handled by R. T. Annadurai. Actor M. S. Bhaskar sang a Gaana song in the film. The film was shot in Pondicherry, Courtallam and Ambasamudram.

Soundtrack

The film score and the soundtrack were composed by Aadhish Uthriyan. The soundtrack, released in 2009, features 5 tracks with lyrics written by S. P. Chandrasekar, Kadhalmadhi and S. T. Gunasekaran.

Release
The film was released on 6 May 2009 alongside three other films.

Critical reception

Behindwoods.com rated the film 0.5 out of 5 and wrote, "Most of the scenes in the movie border in on repulsiveness and you are sure to frown in more scenes than one for the same reason". A critic wrote, "The director has far-stretched the theme and made it a fantasy fare with needless romance, stunt and oft-seen comedy sequences. At one point of time, it begins on a path that is much easily predictable". Pavithra Srinivasan of Rediff.com rated the film 1.5 out of 5 and said, "Innoruvan is 20 years too late". A reviewer rated the film 2 out of 5 and stated, "The performances by the lead pair was good and if the makers had focused on the quality and the content of the story then it could have worked out even better". S. R. Ashok Kumar of The Hindu said, "Atchaya Multi Media’s ‘Innoruvan’ has a positive message with a neat story line on which bank the happenings. But the main problem with it is the commercial elements".

Box office
The film took a below average opening at the Chennai box office.

References

2009 films
2000s Tamil-language films
Indian comedy-drama films
Films shot in Puducherry
2009 directorial debut films